David William Magson (born 4 May 1945) is a mathematician and businessman, who was awarded the MBE in 2003 for his contribution to the recovery effort which followed the first terrorist bombing in Bali in 2002 in which more than 200 people, both Indonesians and visitors, lost their lives. Immediately following the bombing, Magson assisted wounded Australians to evacuate and then worked in the morgue for four days on behalf of the British Consul.

Magson witnessed the devastation and social upheaval which affected the people of Bali after the bombing and readily accepted the role of chair of YKIP (Yayasan Kemanusiaan Ibu Pertiwi, or the Humanitarian Foundation for Mother Earth), which was established to help the needy in Bali through health and education programs.

Established only days after the Bali bomb blast of October 12, 2002, YKIP is intended as a living tribute to the 222 dead and 446 injured victims of the two blasts. YKIP is a donor agency for other organizations to support projects on Bali, knowing that their funds will be used in a productive and transparent manner. YKIP also has its own projects.(YKIP's current projects are:  KEMBALI Scholarship program; KIDS scholarship program for the Bali bomb survivors; Vocational Scholarship Program and University Scholarship Program ;for more details see http://ykip.org/our-programs).

David Magson held the chairperson’s position from 2003 until 2008. Through the company of which he is Chairman, Mitrais, he continues to provide support for YKIP in the form of serviced office space, volunteer webmasters and IT support.(See YKIP's JOURNEY: The first five years, published by YKIP, 2007, page 10.; also www.ykip.org/about-us and www.ykip.org/boards-staff).

He holds dual Australian and British citizenship. A mathematician, he is a member of the Australian Institute of Company Directors, a Fellow of the Australian Institute of Mining and Metallurgy and a member of the Indonesian Australian Business Council.(see www.iabc.or.id).

Prior to moving to South East Asia, he spent more than 20 years in the mining industry, working in the UK, Africa, and Australia.  He currently lives in Singapore.

Aside from serving as the Chairman of Mitrais Pte Ltd,  Magson is also the CEO  of Ksatria PTE Ltd and a Board Member of MediRecords Pty Ltd. He is also a past chairperson of the Bali International School, Oniqua Pty Ltd, and Auslang International Pty Ltd and a founding Vice President of the Australian Indonesian Business Council (Bali).

Notes

References
 2004 Official Honours List
 YKIP annual report
 News Article

External links
 Mitrais - Official website

Members of the Order of the British Empire
Living people
1945 births